Kokolajnščak is a settlement in the Municipality of Sveti Jurij ob Ščavnici in northeastern Slovenia. It lies in the Slovene Hills in an area that is part of the traditional region of Styria, and izt is now included in the Mura Statistical Region.

References

External links
Kokolajnščak at Geopedia

Populated places in the Municipality of Sveti Jurij ob Ščavnici